Nicaraguan Civil War may refer to:
 Nicaraguan Civil War (1926-1927)
 Nicaraguan Revolution (1962–1990)